Peter A. Laudati was a sports promoter and a part-owner of the Providence Steam Roller of the National Football League. He was also responsible for the construction of the team's stadium, the Cyclodome. Prior to this, he was a prominent Providence real estate developer.

Laudati was an ardent promoter of sports ventures; in addition to the Cycledrome he built Providence’s Kinsley Park, home of the Providence Grays baseball team in the 1930s. He was instrumental in bringing the New York Yankees, featuring Babe Ruth and Lou Gehrig, to play an exhibition game at that park. He then established the Steam Roller football team in 1916 with James Dooley and Charles Coppen.

The Steam Roller became a member of the NFL in 1925. In 1928, they became the first team in New England to win an NFL Championship. According to a Steam Roller cash book, kept by Laudati in 1927, that was donated to the Pro Football Hall of Fame by Ray Monaco, who also played with the Washington Redskins and the Cleveland Rams, after a November 8 game against the New York Giants, brought a total intake of $9,911.51. Added to a $1,000 loan received from Laudati a day earlier, that gave the team a balance of nearly $11,000, more than enough to cover the game’s expenses of $5,840.64. The NFL took 1 percent of the gate receipts from each game and the Cycledrome took 15 percent; players’ salaries ($1,972) and the visiting team’s share ($2,475) accounted for most of the other expenses.

However, by 1931 financial issues forced the team to go on a hiatus and fold in 1933. Laudati turned this to his advantage. In 1934 he leveled the Cycledrome and built on the site an E.M. Lowe drive-in movie theater. When it opened in 1937, it was only the second drive-in theater in the nation, the first being in Jersey City. Although his name was not used in connection with the Cycledrome in any of the contemporary newspaper accounts, the chief financier and owner of the building was Laudati.

He died in September 1977.

References
Rhode Island Artin Ruins: Providence Cyclodome

1977 deaths
National Football League owners
National Football League executives
Providence Steam Roller
Year of birth missing